See also Queen Amanoa, a fictional character from the Star Wars expanded universe.

Amanoa is a genus from the family Phyllanthaceae first described as a genus in 1775. It is native to South America, Central America, the West Indies, and tropical Africa.

Species

Formerly included
moved to other genera:  Bridelia Cleistanthus Gonatogyne Pentabrachion Richeria

References

 
Phyllanthaceae genera
Taxa named by Jean Baptiste Christian Fusée-Aublet